Anthidium sichuanense is a species of bee in the family Megachilidae, the leaf-cutter, carder, or mason bees.

Distribution
Southern Asia

References

sichuanense
Insects described in 1992